Ethnic Croats form a small minority North Macedonia. As of 2002, there were 2,686 declared Croats living in the country . They mostly live in the capital city Skopje, the second largest city Bitola and around Lake Ohrid.

In 2006, Croatian President Stjepan Mesić and his Macedonian counterpart Nikola Gruevski announced that the Croats would receive national minority status in Macedonia.

Union of Croats of Macedonia
The Union of Croats in Macedonia is the name of an umbrella group which represents the ethnic Croats living in North Macedonia. The Union was founded in 1996. It is headquartered in Skopje, with branches in Bitola, Štip and Ohrid-Struga. The Union has 1,187 members , which is approximately 45% of the entire Croat population in the Republic of Macedonia, according to the 2002 census.

In 2005, along with the Croatian Heritage Foundation, the union organised the Week of Croats in Macedonia in Zagreb as part of its annual minority week.

See also  
Croatia–North Macedonia relations
Croats

References

External links 
Hrvati i njihovi potomci u Makedoniji
Union of Croats of Macedonia 

Macedonia
Ethnic groups in North Macedonia